The Communist Party "Communists of Russia" (CPCR; ; Kommunisticheskaya partiya «Kommunisty Rossii», KPKR) or simply Communists of Russia (CR; ; Kommunisty Rossii, KR) is an anti-revisionist Marxist–Leninist communist party in Russia. Communists of Russia was founded in May 2009 as a public non-commercial organisation, and officially registered as a political party in April 2012.

The party has regional organisations in 69 regions and operates in 70 regions of Russia and has official affiliation with two inter-regional public associations: the Communists of St. Petersburg and Leningrad Region and the Communists of the Far East. The party's main rival on the left of Russia's political spectrum is the Communist Party of the Russian Federation (CPRF), which sees itself as the successor to the Communist Party of the Soviet Union (CPSU). The KR considers itself an alternative to the CPRF, which it believes is no longer a Marxist party and will not be able to return to power as long as Gennady Zyuganov is First Secretary. However, the party has been widely described as a spoiler party, including by the CPRF.
On March 18, 2022, an extraordinary party congress was held, at which a new chairman of the Central Committee of the party, Malinkovich Sergey Aleksandrovich, was elected.

Platform 
For the 2016 Russian legislative election, the Communists of Russia released an electoral platform titled "Ten Stalinist Strikes on Capitalism", which called for broad nationalization, the return of the death penalty for certain crimes,  medical reform, and a constitutional ban on raising the retirement age.

Election results

Presidential elections

Legislative elections

Regional elections 
At the Russian regional elections in 2012, the party got 2 to 3.5 percent of the vote and two seats.

Khakassia 
In the 2018 Khakassia Supreme Council election, the Communists of Russia won 8.01% of the vote, and won 2 of the 50 seats on the Supreme Council.

Nenets Autonomous Okrug 

Rostov Oblast 

Tula Oblast 

Ulyanovsk Oblast 

Yaroslavl Oblast 
In the 2018 Yaroslavl Oblast Duma election, the Communists of Russia won over 5% of the vote, winning 1 of the 50 seats on the Yaroslavl Oblast Duma.

Criticism 
The Communists of Russia has been criticized by a number of left-wing political groups and parties in Russia, as well as former members of the party, which have denounced the party as a spoiler and a front for the Russian government. In June 2015, the Communist Party of the Russian Federation filed a lawsuit with the Moscow Arbitration Court against the Communists of Russia party to stop using the name, citing their  similarity. On 11 July 2016, the court dismissed this claim. In April 2016, the Communist Party of the Russian Federation also accused the Communists of Russia's electoral platform, titled "Ten Stalinist Strikes on Capitalism", of copying their own, titled "Zyuganov's Ten Theses on Bringing the Country Out of the Crisis".

The Russian United Labour Front, a left-wing organization in Russia, condemns the Communists of Russia as a front for government officials to splinter the left-wing vote. In an article they published, they highlight that the Communists of Russia was able to get official recognition immediately, whereas their organization had their recognition application refused seven times, and also note how the Communists of Russia were able to enter the Supreme Council of the Republic of Khakassia without collecting the signatures required for other parties who wish to compete in regional elections. They also accuse the party of running businessmen closely associated with the ruling United Russia party as candidates, gaining a disproportionate media spotlight, and needlessly attacking the Communist Party of the Russian Federation. The Russian United Labour Front also has exposed advertisements by the Communists of Russia which promise to pay people 300 Rubles for attending their rallies, and sent one writer to do just that.

Former deputy chairman of the Communists of Russia, Konstantin Zhukov, claimed that party leader Maxim Suraykin has warped the party from a genuine left-wing party into a tool of the government to cripple the Communist Party of the Russian Federation. According to Zhukov, Suraykin has removed the Communists of Russia's collective decision making structure, and ignored other senior party members to further turn the party into his own. Zhukov claimed that 10 of the 15 candidates the party put forth to compete in the 2016 Russian legislative election in Moscow were put forth by Andrey Vorobyov, the governor of Moscow Oblast and member of the ruling United Russia party, whereas just 2 were members of the Communists of Russia. For the 2019 Moscow City Duma election, Zhukov accused 26 of the party's 32 candidates of being put forth by Sergey Sobyanin, the Mayor of Moscow and United Russia member.

The news website Meduza noted that the Communists of Russia was running two candidates with virtually identical names to two Communist Party candidates in the 2021 Russian legislative election in Moscow.

References

External links 
 Official website

2012 establishments in Russia
Communist parties in Russia
Stalinist parties
Anti-revisionist organizations
Far-left politics in Russia
Political parties established in 2012
Registered political parties in Russia